Series 2 of Top Gear, a British motoring magazine and factual television programme, was broadcast in the United Kingdom on BBC Two during 2003, consisting of ten episodes between 11 May and 20 July; a compilation episode, titled "Best of Top Gear", was broadcast after the series concluded on 27 July, featuring the best moments of the previous two series. Following the first series, the programme saw a changing the hosting line-up, with motoring enthusiast Jason Dawe being replaced by James May, who had previously worked on a series of the original 1977 programme of the same name. It also saw the credits of the programme officially denoting the anonymous driver, "The Stig", as an additional presenter, albeit not in their actual identity. 
During the original 2003 broadcast of the series, a segment known as "Greatest Car" was shown, where the three hosts (along with five guest hosts) would present a short film about a car they believed was the greatest ever made. Though the Land Rover, whose segment was presented by Richard Hammond, would eventually win, this segment would be cut out of all future airings of the show and means that Series 2 has not been seen in its full, uncut entirety since its original airing. When the series was added to BBC iPlayer in 2021, most of the “Greatest Car” segments were restored, although the Rolls-Royce Silver Cloud and Citroën DS segments were still missing. It is likely the Rolls-Royce Cloud  segment has been omitted on iPlayer versions and reruns as it features Stuart Hall who was subsequently convicted of historical sex offences against children 2013 although the reason the Citroen DS segment is  still missing is unknown.

Episodes

Best-of episodes

References

2003 British television seasons
Top Gear seasons